

History

Jorvan Vieira
On 25 May 2007, Jorvan Vieira was appointed as head coach. Under him, Iraq reached the final of the 2007 WAFF Championship and won the 2007 AFC Asian Cup. 
Vieira resigned after the Asian Cup.

Jorvan Vieira was reappointed in September 2008. After a disappointing 2009 Arabian Gulf Cup, Vieira was sacked.

Egil Olsen
Egil Olsen was appointed as coach on 17 September 2007. Under him, Iraq advanced to the third round of the 2010 FIFA World Cup qualification, but after a 1–1 draw with China, the FA sacked Olsen and replaced him with Adnan Hamad.

Adnan Hamad
Hamad was appointed on 27 February 2008 to lead Iraq in the remaining 2010 World Cup qualifiers. Iraq failed to advance to the final round as a 1–0 defeat to Qatar saw them finish in third in the group. Following this, the Iraq FA disbanded the team and sacked Hamad.

Bora Milutinovic
Under Bora, Iraq participated in the 2009 FIFA Confederations Cup, which they qualified for by winning the 2007 AFC Asian Cup. They started the tournament with a 0–0 draw with hosts South Africa, before losing to UEFA Euro 2008 winners Spain by one goal to nil. Iraq drew the last game 0–0 with New Zealand and were knocked out.

Nadhim Shaker
Nadhim Shaker was appointed as caretaker coach between July and November 2009 and won the 2009 UAE International Cup.

Wolfgang Sidka 
Wolfgang Sidka was appointed coach in August 2010 to lead Iraq in the 2011 AFC Asian Cup. Iraq reached the quarter finals, as they lost 1–0 to Australia. In the 2014 FIFA World Cup qualification, Iraq advanced to the third round but Sidka's contract was not renewed and he was succeeded by Zico in August 2011.

Zico 
Zico signed a contract with Iraq Football Federation on 28 August 2011 and first managed the national team in a match against Jordan on 2 September 2011. He won the group in the third round thus advancing to the final round.

Zico resigned as coach of the Iraqi national team on 27 November 2012 after little more than a year in the post, saying the country's football association had failed to fulfill the terms of his contract. He had 10 wins and six draws in 21 games with Iraq.

Hakim Shaker
Hakeem Shaker took over as interim coach and lost the finals of both the 2012 WAFF Championship and 2013 Arabian Gulf Cup. He was reappointed in September 2013 and qualified for the 2015 AFC Asian Cup by beating China 3-1. However, Iraq finished bottom of the group in the 2014 Arabian Gulf Cup leading to the sacking of Hakeem Shaker and the appointment of Radhi Shenaishil.

Vladimir Petrovic
In February 2013, Vladimir Petrovic was appointed for the remaining World Cup qualifiers, but lost all three matches and Iraq finished bottom of their group. Petrovic was sacked in September 2013.

Radhi Shenaishil
On 13 December 2014, Radhi Shenaishil was appointed as coach to lead Iraq in the 2015 AFC Asian Cup. Under Radhi, Iraq defeated Iran in the quarter-finals in penalties and  finished the 2015 AFC Asian Cup in fourth place, after losing 2–3 to United Arab Emirates in third/fourth place play-off. After the tournament, Shenaishil returned to managing Qatar SC.

On 20 April 2016, Radhi Shenaishil was re-appointed to lead Iraq in the final round. After losing five of their first seven games, Iraq were eliminated and Shenaishil was sacked.

Akram Salman
Iraq appointed Akram Salman as manager but he was sacked in June 2015 after losing 4–0 to Japan in a friendly match.

Yahya Alwan
Yahya Alwan was appointed in August 2015. Due to poor performances, Abdul-Ghani Shahad replaced him as interim coach for the final qualifier in March 2016.

Abdul-Ghani Shahad
Abdul-Ghani Shahad  was appointed as caretaker coach and led Iraq to qualification for the 2019 AFC Asian Cup and the final round by beating Vietnam 3-2.

Basim Qasim
Basim Qasim was appointed in May 2017 to lead Iraq for the remaining qualifiers. He led Iraq to the semifinals of the 23rd Arabian Gulf Cup. The FA decided not to renew his contract in August 2018.

Srecko Katanec
On 3 September 2018, Srečko Katanec was appointed as head coach on a three-year contract. Under Katanec, Iraq reached the round of 16 of the 2019 AFC Asian Cup as they lost to eventual champions Qatar by one goal.

In August 2019, Iraq finished as runners-up of the 2019 WAFF Championship. He also led Iraq to the semifinals of the 24th Arabian Gulf Cup.

On 16 June 2021, it was rumoured that the Iraqi FA and Katanec are having collision after the former's failure to pay salary for the manager and it was hinted that Katanec might leave the Iraqi team. He ended up resigning less than a week later.

Dick Advocaat
On 1 August 2021, Dick Advocaat was unveiled as the Iraq manager ahead of the third round of World Cup 2022 qualifiers. However, after 6 qualifiers with 4 draws and 2 losses, Advocaat, along with assistant manager Cor Pot resigned on 21 November 2021 ahead of the 2021 FIFA Arab Cup.

Željko Petrović
On 21 November 2021, it was announced that Željko Petrović, one of three assistants Advocaat had during his tenure, stayed on to become the caretaker manager which would last until the end of the Arab Cup, with Rahim Hameed, Advocaat's third assistant, to stay on as assistant manager. Despite crashing out of the group stages, he was given a permanent role, but Hameed was sacked. A win, a draw and a loss later, and Petrović was sacked on 2 February 2022.

Abdul-Ghani Shahad
Abdul-Ghani Shahad was appointed as caretaker manager of the national team for the second time, beating Zambia in a friendly in Baghdad, then taking on the UAE and beating them 1-0 but drawing against Syria. Despite being unbeaten in these three matches, Iraq failed to finish third and advance to the fourth round of qualifiers and the FA decided not to give Shahad the job full time.

Radhi Shenaishil
While the FA’s search for a new manager was ongoing, newly-appointed olympic team manager Radhi Shenaishil was made in charge of the national team for the 2022 Jordan International Tournament in September 2022, and then later was in charge of friendly games against Mexico and Ecuador.

Jesús Casas
On 5 November 2022, the FA confirmed that Jesús Casas will take charge of the national team for four years on an annual payment of $1m split into monthly wages. Radhi Shenaishil would lead the national team for the Mexico and Ecuador games in Spain, while he would take charge of the games against Costa Rica and Venezuela in Iraq, with his first came coming on 17 November 2022. Those two games were cancelled, so the national team played an intra-squad friendly under Casas’ view. His first official match came on 30 December 2022 against Kuwait at the Al-Minaa Olympic Stadium as a warm up game for the 25th Arabian Gulf Cup in Basra, then managed his first competitive match against Oman on 6 January 2023 at the aforementioned tournament.

List of managers
The team has had 41 different coaches, of whom 21 have been from Iraq.
 Only record the results that affect the FIFA/Coca-Cola World Ranking. See FIFA 'A' matches criteria.

References

External links
 Iraqi Football Website
 Iraq National Team History

Iraq